Esterlin Franco Hernandez (Sterling Franco) is a former baseball player in Japan.  Esterlin was born in 1980 in the Dominican Republic.  Esterlin went undrafted in the MLB draft.  He played in the Hiroshima Carp in the Central League.

References

Pittsfield Astros players
Martinsville Astros players
Hiroshima Toyo Carp players
Dominican Republic expatriate baseball players in Japan
1980 births
Living people